Michael Reed (born October 28, 1987 in Albuquerque, New Mexico) is an American soccer player.

Career
Reed played his college soccer with the University of New Mexico between 2006 and 2010, before signing his first professional contract with Minnesota Stars FC at the beginning of their 2012 NASL season. At the end of February 2015, Reed signed with NASL club Atlanta Silverbacks in order to help fill out their squad before the 2015 season.

On 10 January 2018, Reed became Nashville SC's first-ever transfer signing when they purchased his contract from San Antonio FC, where he had been the team captain. Reed was named captain for Nashville SC's first ever match, a friendly against Atlanta United on February 10, 2018.

After Nashville made the move to MLS, Reed joined USL Championship side Memphis 901 on January 16, 2020.

References

External links
 Lobos profile

1987 births
Living people
American soccer players
Association football midfielders
Atlanta Silverbacks players
Minnesota United FC (2010–2016) players
New Mexico Lobos men's soccer players
North American Soccer League players
San Antonio FC players
Soccer players from Albuquerque, New Mexico
USL Championship players
Nashville SC (2018–19) players
Memphis 901 FC players